The Indian Super League Player of the Season, officially known as Indian Super League Hero of the League for sponsorship ties with Hero MotoCorp, is an annual association football award presented to the best player in the Indian Super League each season.

The Indian Super League was founded in 2013, eight teams competed in the 2014 inaugural season. It became the joint top-tier of Indian football league system by 2017–18 season and is the top-tier since 2022–23 season. The first Hero of the League was awarded to Kerala Blasters striker Iain Hume in 2014. Sunil Chhetri is the first Indian player to have won the award in 2017–18 season.

Winners

Awards won by nationality

Awards won by club

See also
 Indian Super League
 Indian Super League Golden Boot
 Indian Super League Golden Glove
 Indian Super League Winning Pass of the League
 Indian Super League Emerging Player of the League

References

External links
 Indian Super League website

Hero of the League
India
Awards established in 2014
2014 establishments in India
Annual events in India